Silvio Lafuenti (or spells as La Fuenti; born 9 August 1970 in Ostia Lido, Italy) is an Italian retired footballer who played as a goalkeeper.

External links
 

1970 births
Italian footballers
Italy youth international footballers
Living people
Serie C players
S.S. Chieti Calcio players
U.S. Alessandria Calcio 1912 players
U.S. Livorno 1915 players
U.S. Catanzaro 1929 players
A.S.D. Gallipoli Football 1909 players
Footballers from Rome
A.S.D. Martina Calcio 1947 players
Association football goalkeepers